The chess competition was held at the 2019 Winter Deaflympics between 13 and 20 December 2019 at Hotel Aurora except on 18 December. The chess competition which was chosen as a sport being part of the multi-sport event was an unprecedented move and it made its debut at this edition of the Winter Deaflympics.

Both men and women took part in the singles blitz event and in the team event.

Medal table

Medal summary

References 

2019 in chess
2019 Winter Deaflympics events